North Somerset is a unitary authority in the ceremonial county of Somerset, England. As a unitary authority, North Somerset is administered independently of the non-metropolitan county of Somerset. Its administrative headquarters are located in the town hall of Weston-super-Mare.

In the United Kingdom, the term listed building refers to a building or other structure officially designated as being of special architectural, historical or cultural significance; Grade II* structures are those considered to be "particularly significant buildings of more than local interest". Listing was begun by a provision in the Town and Country Planning Act 1947. Once listed, severe restrictions are imposed on the modifications allowed to a building's structure or its fittings. In England, the authority for listing under the Planning (Listed Buildings and Conservation Areas) Act 1990 rests with Historic England, a non-departmental public body sponsored by the Department for Digital, Culture, Media and Sport; local authorities have a responsibility to regulate and enforce the planning regulations.

There are 80 Grade II* listed buildings in North Somerset. The oldest are Norman churches. From the Middle Ages onward there are more churches and some manor houses, such as Tyntesfield, Clevedon Court and Leigh Court, with their ancillary buildings. The list includes several village or church crosses and monuments in churchyards. More recent entries include Birnbeck Pier which was designed by Eugenius Birch and opened in 1867, and the Waterworks at Blagdon which was completed in 1905.

Buildings

|}

See also
 Grade II* listed buildings in Somerset
 Grade I listed buildings in North Somerset

Notes

References

External links

 
Lists of Grade II* listed buildings in Somerset